Adornis.com was an online jewelry retailer created during the 90's dot-com boom that later collapsed.

Origin
Adornis.com, Inc. was an online jewelry retailer launched by Irish entrepreneur Declan Ganley with co-founder Sean Ganley, brother of Declan, in 1999, part of the dot-com boom of the 90's. The company was funded through Ganley's private equity firm, the Ganley Group, with $30m in equity funding, $30m in debt financing and a personal investment by Ganley of $5.5m. The French investments firm Richemont Investments SA, (a division of Compagnie Financiere Richemont AG) paid approx $5m to own 20% and the Irish internet firm Nua Internet Services owned 10%. Ganley owned around 40%, with the remainder owned by three American hedge funds.
Adornis.com was a winner of Forbes magazine's 'Best of the Web'  "Classic, contemporary and estate jewelry from less than $100 to more than $10,000. Browse or search by designer, product type, type of material and gemstone or price....Excellent product descriptions and multiple close-up views". Time magazine described Adornis.com as 'bauble central for luxury items' in Dec 1999.

Fate
It was valued at $25 million at one point but collapsed and its stock was sold off to Overstock.com for about $2m. The remains were converted to Adornis.com Limited, founded on 7 September 2001. That company's latest annual return was filed on 31 December 2005.

References

Retail companies of the Republic of Ireland